Inês Cristina Zuber is a Portuguese politician, who, from January 2012 until January 2016, served as a Member of the European Parliament, representing Portugal for the Portuguese Communist Party. She was elected in 2014 on the Unitary Democratic Coalition list.

Parliamentary service
Vice-Chair, Committee on Employment and Social Affairs (2012-2014)
Vice-Chair, Delegation for relations with the countries of Central America (2012-2014)
Vice Chair, Committee on Women's Rights and Gender Equality (2014-2016)

References

External links
 

1980 births
Living people
Portuguese Communist Party MEPs
MEPs for Portugal 2009–2014
MEPs for Portugal 2014–2019
21st-century women MEPs for Portugal
People from Évora